The Last Rebel is a film from 1918. It stars Belle Bennett, Joe King and Walt Whitman. The film was directed by Gilbert P. Hamilton from a screenplay by George Elwood Jenks. It is a Triangle Film Corporation production. The plot is set during the American Civil War era and features lovers divided by the war. It is a five-reel picture and is considered lost. It was released June 8, 1918. The film stars Belle Bennett and  Walt Whitman. Lillian Langdon, Joe Bennett, and Lucretia Harris were also part of the cast.

Cast
Belle Bennett as Cora Batesford/Floribel Batesford
Walt Whitman as Colonel Batesford
Lillian Langdon - Mrs. Batesford
Joseph Bennett as Jack Batesford 
Joe King as Harry Apperson/Lucky Jim Apperson
Jack Curtis as Pensinger Gale
Lucretia Harris as Mammy Lulu
Anna Dodge as Landlady

References

External links
 The Last Rebel at IMDb.com

1918 films
Lost American films
Triangle Film Corporation films
American Civil War films
1910s romance films
American black-and-white films
Films directed by Gilbert P. Hamilton
1910s American films